York County (Pennsylvania Dutch: Yarrick Kaundi) is  a county in the Commonwealth of Pennsylvania. As of the 2020 census, the population was 456,438. Its county seat is York. The county was created on August 19, 1749, from part of Lancaster County and named either after the Duke of York, an early patron of the Penn family,  or for the city and county of York in England.

York County comprises the York-Hanover, Pennsylvania Metropolitan Statistical Area, which is also included in the Harrisburg-York-Lebanon, Pennsylvania Combined Statistical Area. It is in the Susquehanna Valley, a large fertile agricultural region in South Central Pennsylvania.

Based on the Articles of Confederation having been adopted in York by the Second Continental Congress on November 15, 1777, the local government and business community began referring to York in the 1960s as the first capital of the United States of America.  The designation has been debated by historians ever since. Congress considered York and the borough of Wrightsville on the eastern side of York County along the Susquehanna River as the nation's permanent capital before Washington, D.C. was selected.

Geography

The county is bound to its eastern border by the Susquehanna River. Its southern border is the Mason–Dixon line, which separates Pennsylvania and Maryland. Within the U.S. piedmont region, York County is generally hilly and rises to the Blue Ridge Mountains in the northwest, where it is bordered by Yellow Breeches Creek. Interior waterways include Codorus and Conewago Creeks, and Lakes Lehman, Kiwanis, Marburg, Pahagaco, Pinchot, Redman, and Williams.

Adjacent counties
Cumberland County (north)
Dauphin County (northeast)
Lancaster County (east)
Harford County, Maryland (southeast)
Baltimore County, Maryland (south)
Carroll County, Maryland (southwest)
Adams County (west)

Major roads and highways

Climate
Most of York County has a hot-summer humid continental climate (Dfa) and the hardiness zones are 6b and 7a. The latest temperature averages show some low-lying eastern areas of the county to have a humid subtropical climate (Cfa.)

Demographics

As of the census of 2000, there were 381,751 people, 148,219 households, and 105,531 families residing in the county.  The population density was 422 people per square mile (163/km2).  There were 156,720 housing units at an average density of 173 per square mile (67/km2).  The racial makeup of the county was 92.76% White, 3.69% African American, 0.18% Native American, 0.86% Asian, 0.03% Pacific Islander, 1.39% from other races, and 1.10% from two or more races. Hispanic or Latino of any race were 2.96% of the population. 42.0% were of German, 12.6% American, 7.7% Irish, 6.4% English and 5.1% Italian ancestry. 94.8% spoke English and 2.9% Spanish as their first language.

There were 148,219 households, out of which 32.50% had children under the age of 18 living with them, 58.30% were married couples living together, 9.00% had a female householder with no husband present, and 28.80% were non-families. 23.30% of all households were made up of individuals, and 9.20% had someone living alone who was 65 years of age or older. The average household size was 2.52 and the average family size was 2.98.

In the county, the population was spread out, with 24.60% under the age of 18, 7.50% from 18 to 24, 30.30% from 25 to 44, 24.00% from 45 to 64, and 13.50% who were 65 years of age or older. The median age was 38 years. For every 100 females there were 96.70 males. For every 100 females age 18 and over, there were 93.80 males.

As of 2006, the York-Hanover Metropolitan Statistical Area was the fastest-growing metro area in the Northeast region, and was ranked among the fastest-growing in the nation, according to the "2006 Population Estimates for Metropolitan and Micropolitan Statistical Areas" (U.S. Census Bureau). The estimates listed York-Hanover as the 95th fastest-growing metro area in the nation, increasing 9.1 percent between 2000 and 2006.

York city had a 77.3 percent increase in the number of residents of Hispanic or Latino origin, based on a comparison of the 2000 and 2010 U.S. census results. The city's 30.9 percent Hispanic population (as of December 2017) is more than that of other places in the area.

York County is home to Martin's Potato Chips in Thomasville, Utz Quality Foods, Inc. in Hanover, Snyder's of Hanover in Hanover, Hanover Foods in Hanover, Gibble's Potato Chips in York, Wolfgang Candy in York, The Bon-Ton in York, Dentsply in York, and a major manufacturing branch of Harley-Davidson Motor Company.

2020 Census

Dialect
The Central Pennsylvania accent and the Susquehanna dialect are the two most commonly heard speech patterns in the county, however there are numerous Mennonites and other persons of Pennsylvania Dutch descent that inhabit the county, who tend to speak with dialects similar to Pennsylvania Dutch English.

Metropolitan Statistical Area
The U.S. Office of Management and Budget has designated York County as the York–Hanover, PA Metropolitan Statistical Area. The United States Census Bureau ranked the York–Hanover, PA Metropolitan Statistical Area as the 9th most populous in the state of Pennsylvania, and 115th most populous Metropolitan Statistical Area (MSA) in the United States as of July 1, 2012.

The Office of Management and Budget has further designated the York–Hanover MSA as a component of the more extensive Harrisburg–York–Lebanon combined statistical area, the 43rd most populous Combined Statistical Area (CSA) and the 49th most populous primary statistical area of the United States as of July 1, 2012. As of the 2017 estimates, the CSA's 1.26 million people ranks 5th in the state of Pennsylvania.

Politics and government
Prior to 1952, York County was a Democratic stronghold in presidential elections, voting majority Republican only four times before then. Between the founding of the party in 1828 and 1900, the county voted Democratic every time, one of only a handful of counties in Pennsylvania to do so. Starting with the 1952 election, it has become a Republican stronghold with Lyndon Johnson being the lone Democrat to win the county since. Since then, Jimmy Carter in 1976 and Barack Obama in 2008 are the only Democratic presidential candidates who have received over 40% of the county's vote, and George H. W. Bush in 1992 is the only Republican not to win a majority. The only real pockets of Democratic support are in the city of York, which has long sent Democrats to the state house. 

|}

According to the Secretary of State's office, a majority of voters in York County are registered as Republicans. As of November 7, 2022, there are 311,917 registered voters in the county.

 Republican: 160,902 (51.58%)
 Democratic: 99,216 (31.81%)
 Independent: 42,293 (13.56%)
 Third Party: 9,506 (3.05%)

County commissioners
Julie Wheeler, President, Republican
Ron Smith, Republican
Doug Hoke, Vice President, Democrat

Other county offices

Clerk of Courts, Dan Byrnes, Republican
Controller, Greg Bower, Republican
Coroner, Pamela Gay, Republican
District Attorney, David Sunday, Republican
Prothonotary, Allison Blew, Republican
Recorder of Deeds, Laura Shue, Republican
Register of Wills & Clerk of Orphans' Court, Bryan Tate, Republican
Sheriff, Richard P. Keuerleber III, Republican
Treasurer, Barbara Bair, Republican

State House of Representatives

State Senate

United States House of Representatives

United States Senate

Education

Public school districts

Vocational school
 York County School of Technology

Public charter schools

Crispus Attucks Youthbuild Charter School (K–6) – York
 Helen Thackston Charter School (6–12) – York
Lincoln Charter School (K–5) – York
New Hope Academy Charter School (K–6) – York
York Academy Regional Charter School
York Adams Academy (formerly York County High School)

Independent schools

Intermediate Unit
Lincoln Intermediate Unit (IU#12) region includes: Adams County, Franklin County and York County. The agency offers school districts, home schooled students and private schools many services including: special education services, combined purchasing, and instructional technology services. It runs Summer Academy which offers both art and academic strands designed to meet the individual needs of gifted, talented and high achieving students. Additional services include: Curriculum Mapping, Professional Development for school employees,  Adult Education, Nonpublic School Services, Business Services, Migrant & ESL (English as a Second Language), Instructional Services, Management Services, and Technology Services. It also provides a GED program to adults who want to earn a high school diploma and literacy programs. The Lincoln Intermediate Unit is governed by a 13-member Board of Directors, each a member of a local school board from the 25 school districts. Board members are elected by school directors of all 25 school districts for three-year terms that begin the first day of July. There are 29 intermediate units in Pennsylvania. They are funded by school districts, state and federal program specific funding and grants. IUs do not have the power to tax.

Colleges and universities

Adult education
YTI Career Institute
Motorcycle Technology Center
York Time Institute

Communities

Under Pennsylvania law, there are four types of incorporated municipalities: cities, boroughs, townships, and, in only one case, towns. York County has 72 of these. The following cities, boroughs and townships are in York County:

City
York (county seat)

Boroughs

Cross Roads
Dallastown
Delta
Dillsburg
Dover
East Prospect
Fawn Grove
Felton
Franklintown
Glen Rock
Goldsboro
Hallam
Hanover
Jacobus
Jefferson
Lewisberry
Loganville
Manchester
Mount Wolf
New Freedom
New Salem
North York
Railroad
Red Lion
Seven Valleys
Shrewsbury
Spring Grove
Stewartstown
Wellsville
West York
Windsor
Winterstown
Wrightsville
Yoe
York Haven
Yorkana

Townships

Carroll
Chanceford
Codorus
Conewago
Dover
East Hopewell
East Manchester
Fairview
Fawn
Franklin
Heidelberg
Hellam
Hopewell
Jackson
Lower Chanceford
Lower Windsor
Manchester
Manheim
Monaghan
Newberry
North Codorus
North Hopewell
Paradise
Peach Bottom
Penn
Shrewsbury
Spring Garden
Springettsbury
Springfield
Warrington
Washington
West Manchester
West Manheim
Windsor
York

Census-designated places
Census-designated places are unincorporated communities designated by the U.S. Census Bureau for the purposes of compiling demographic data. They are not actual jurisdictions under Pennsylvania law.

Other unincorporated communities

 Accomac
 Admire
 Airville
 Ambau
 Andersontown
 Bandanna
 Bermudian
 Big Mountain
 Blackrock
 Bridgeville
 Brogue
 Bryansville
 Cly
 Craley
 Codorus Furnace
 Conewago Heights
 Davidsburg
 Detters Mill
 Etters
 Fayfield
 Fireside Terrace
 Foustown
 Fuhrmans Mill
 Gatchellville
 Glades
 Glenville
 Gnatstown
 Hametown
 Hanover Junction
 Hopewell Center
 Kralltown
 Leaders Heights
 Leibharts Corner
 Lockport (under Lake Clarke)
 Mackey Ford
 Mount Royal
 Muddy Creek Forks
 New Bridgeville
 New Park
 Nauvoo
 Ore Valley
 Porters Sideling
 Reesers Summit
 Rossville
 Saginaw
 Shenks Ferry
 Siddonsburg
 Spring Forge
 Starview
 Stoverstown
 Strickler
 Strinestown
 Sunnyburn
 Thomasville
 Tolna
 Valley Forge
 Violet Hill
 Wago Junction
 Woodbine
 Yocumtown
 York Furnace

Population ranking
The population ranking of the following table is based on the 2010 census of York County.

† county seat

Airports
Although York County has no scheduled passenger air service, it has two general-aviation airports: Capital City Airport in Fairview Township in the extreme north and York Airport near Thomasville just south of US 30. The county participates in the Susquehanna Area Regional Airport Authority with Adams, Cumberland, Dauphin, and Franklin Counties. The closest passenger service is at Harrisburg International Airport, Lancaster County Airport, and BWI.

Notable people

See also
Cresap's War
National Register of Historic Places listings in York County, Pennsylvania
Rabbit Transit
Rehmeyer's Hollow – location of the 1928 Hex Hollow murder
US 30 Diner

References

Further reading
 Gibson, John, ed. A Biographical History of York County, Pennsylvania (Genealogical Publishing Com, 1886). Online: archive.org
 Marcello, Ronald E. Small Town America in World War II: War Stories from Wrightsville, Pennsylvania (University of North Texas Press, 2014) 452 pp. 
 Prowell, George Reeser. History of York County, Pennsylvania. Vol. 1. (JH Beers, 1907). Online: Vol.1  google books archive.org, Vol 2. archive.org
 Sheets, Georg R. York County: To the Setting of the Sun : An Illustrated History (American Historical Press. 2nd Edition, 2002)

External links

York County official website

 
1749 establishments in Pennsylvania
Populated places established in 1749